Cut Bank Air Force Station (Perm ID: P-24, SAGE ID: Z-24) is a closed United States Air Force General Surveillance Radar station. It was closed in 1965.

History
The facility was hosted by the 681st Aircraft Control and Warning (AC&W) Squadron, Air Defense Command between April 1952 and June 1965.  Cut Bank AFS replaced an earlier radar site at Del Bonita, Montana (LP-24) which had opened in March 1951.

The 681st AC&W Squadron started operating AN/FPS-3 and AN/FPS-4 radars in April 1952, and initially the station functioned as a Ground-Control Intercept (GCI) and warning station.  As a GCI station, the squadron's role was to guide interceptor aircraft toward unidentified intruders picked up on the unit's radar scopes.   In 1958 an AN/FPS-20 search radar replaced the AN/FPS-3 at this site. In the following year two AN/FPS-6B height-finder radars superseded the AN/FPS-4.

In 1961 this site was integrated into the SAGE system, the squadron being re-designated as the 681st Radar Squadron (SAGE).  The radar squadron provided information 24/7 the SAGE Direction Center where it was analyzed to determine range, direction altitude speed and whether or not aircraft were friendly or hostile.  In 1962 the AN/FPS-20A was further upgraded and redesignated as an AN/FPS-66. In 1963 one AN/FPS-6B was removed and on 31 July, the site was redesignated as NORAD ID Z-24.   In 1964 the other AN/FPS-6B was upgraded to an AN/FPS-90, and an AN/FPS-26A height-finder radar was installed.

In addition to the main facility, Cut Bank operated an AN/FPS-14 Gap Filler site:
 Browning, MT     (P-24A) 
 Sweetgrass, MT   (P-24C) 

The station was closed on 1 March 1965 as part of a general reduction of ADC.  Today it is largely intact, and abandoned.

Air Force units and assignments

Units
 Established as 681st Aircraft Control and Warning Squadron
 Activated 1 March 1951 at Del Bonita (renamed Cut Bank Air Force Station, Montana on 1 December 1953)
 Redesignated as 681st Radar Squadron (SAGE) on 1 March 1961
 Discontinued and inactivated on 25 June 1965

Assignments:
 545th Aircraft Control and Warning Group, 1 March 1951
 29th Air Division, 6 February 1952
 Great Falls Air Defense Sector, 1 July 1960 – 25 June 1965

See also
 List of USAF Aerospace Defense Command General Surveillance Radar Stations

References

  Cornett, Lloyd H. and Johnson, Mildred W., A Handbook of Aerospace Defense Organization  1946 - 1980,  Office of History, Aerospace Defense Center, Peterson AFB, CO (1980).
 Winkler, David F. & Webster, Julie L., Searching the Skies, The Legacy of the United States Cold War Defense Radar Program,  US Army Construction Engineering Research Laboratories, Champaign, IL (1997).
  Information for Cut Bank AFS, MT

Installations of the United States Air Force in Montana
Radar stations of the United States Air Force

Aerospace Defense Command military installations
Buildings and structures in Glacier County, Montana
1952 establishments in Montana
1965 disestablishments in Montana
Military installations established in 1952
Military installations closed in 1965